The 1926 Iowa gubernatorial election was held on November 2, 1926. Incumbent Republican John Hammill defeated Democratic nominee Alex R. Miller with 71.51% of the vote.

General election

Candidates
John Hammill, Republican
Alex R. Miller, Democratic

Results

References

1926
Iowa
Gubernatorial